Halifax commonly refers to:

Halifax, Nova Scotia, Canada
Halifax, West Yorkshire, England
Halifax (bank), a British bank

Halifax may also refer to:

Places

Australia
Halifax, Queensland, a coastal town in the Shire of Hinchinbrook
Halifax Bay, a bay south of the town of Halifax

Canada

Nova Scotia
Halifax, Nova Scotia, the capital city of the province
Downtown Halifax
Halifax Peninsula, part of the core of the municipality
Mainland Halifax, a region of the municipality
Halifax (electoral district), a federal electoral district
Halifax (provincial electoral district), a provincial electoral district
Halifax County, Nova Scotia, the county dissolved into the regional municipality in 1996
Halifax Harbour, a saltwater harbour
Halifax West, a federal electoral district since 1979

Prince Edward Island
Halifax Parish, Prince Edward Island

British Columbia
Halifax Range, a mountain range

United Kingdom
Halifax, West Yorkshire, England
Halifax (UK Parliament constituency)

United States
Halifax, Kentucky, an unincorporated community in Allen County
Halifax, Massachusetts, in Plymouth County
Halifax (MBTA station)
Halifax, Missouri
Halifax, North Carolina
Halifax County, North Carolina 
Halifax, Pennsylvania, a borough in Dauphin County
Halifax Township, Dauphin County, Pennsylvania
Halifax, Vermont, in Windham County
Halifax, Virginia
Halifax County, Virginia (named for George Montague-Dunk, 2nd Earl of Halifax)
Halifax area, in Florida
Halifax River, in Florida (named for George Montague-Dunk, 2nd Earl of Halifax)

People
Halifax (name), including a list of people and characters with the name
Earl of Halifax

Arts, entertainment, and media

Music
Halifax (band), an American rock band
"Halifax", a song by Pete Yorn from ArrangingTime

Brands and enterprises
Halifax (bank), part of the Lloyds Banking Group
Halifax (Ireland), part of the Lloyds Banking Group

Military
, the name of two Canadian naval vessels
HMCS Halifax (FFH 330), the lead ship of the Halifax class
Halifax-class frigate, of the Canadian Navy
HMCS Halifax (K237), a World War II Flower-class corvette for convoy escort duties
, the name of several Royal Navy ships
HMS Halifax (1756), a 22-gun sloop launched in 1756 and captured by the French in the same year at Oswego
HMS Halifax (1768), a 10-gun schooner originally built for merchant service at Halifax, Nova Scotia in 1765
HMS Halifax (1775), a schooner purchased in 1775 and sold 1780
HMS Halifax (1780), an 18-gun sloop, originally USS Ranger, renamed after the ship was captured from the United States Navy on 11 May 1780, and sold in 1781, 
HMS Halifax (1782), a 10-gun schooner purchased in 1782 and sold in 1784
HMS Halifax (1806), an 18-gun sloop launched in 1806 at Halifax, Nova Scotia and broken up in 1814
Handley Page Halifax, a British 4-engine heavy bomber of World War II

Sports

England
F.C. Halifax Town, a professional football club
Halifax Town A.F.C., a former professional football club
Halifax Panthers, a professional rugby league club

Canada
Halifax Thunderbirds, a professional box lacrosse team
Halifax Hurricanes, a professional basketball team
Halifax Mooseheads, a junior ice hockey team
Halifax Wanderers FC, a professional soccer team

Other uses
Halifax College, a college of the University of York, England
Halifax station (disambiguation), stations of the name

See also
Halifax Explosion, a 1917 explosion that leveled a large portion of Halifax, Nova Scotia
Halifax Gibbet, an early guillotine used in Halifax, West Yorkshire